Japanese football in 1953.

Emperor's Cup

Births
January 22 - Mitsuo Kato
June 4 - Mitsuo Watanabe
August 4 - Hiroyuki Usui
September 18 - Toyohito Mochizuki
November 15 - Toshio Takabayashi

External links

 
Seasons in Japanese football